Dahme-Spreewald – Teltow-Fläming III – Oberspreewald-Lausitz I is an electoral constituency (German: Wahlkreis) represented in the Bundestag. It elects one member via first-past-the-post voting. Under the current constituency numbering system, it is designated as constituency 62. It is located in central Brandenburg, comprising the Dahme-Spreewald district and most of the Teltow-Fläming district.

Dahme-Spreewald – Teltow-Fläming III – Oberspreewald-Lausitz I was created for the 2002 federal election. Since 2021, it has been represented by Sylvia Lehmann of the Social Democratic Party (SPD).

Geography
Dahme-Spreewald – Teltow-Fläming III – Oberspreewald-Lausitz I is located in central Brandenburg. As of the 2021 federal election, it comprises the entirety of the Dahme-Spreewald district, the entirety of the Teltow-Fläming district excluding the Jüterbog, Ludwigsfelde, and Niedergörsdorf municipalities, and the municipality of Lübbenau from the Oberspreewald-Lausitz district.

History
Dahme-Spreewald – Teltow-Fläming III – Oberspreewald-Lausitz I was created in 2002 and contained parts of the abolished constituencies of Luckenwalde – Zossen – Jüterbog – Königs Wusterhausen, Bad Liebenwerda – Finsterwalde – Herzberg – Lübben – Luckau, Fürstenwalde – Strausberg – Seelow, und Frankfurt (Oder) – Eisenhüttenstadt – Beeskow. In the 2002 and 2005 elections, it was constituency 62 in the numbering system. In the 2009 election, it was number 63. Since the 2013 election, it has been number 62.

Upon the abolition of the  Zossen Amt ahead of the 2005 election, the former municipality of Groß Schulzendorf was transferred out of the constituency. In the 2009 election, it gained the municipalities of Blankenfelde-Mahlow and Rangsdorf. In the 2017 election, it gained the municipality of Großbeeren.

Members
The constituency was first represented by Peter Danckert of the Social Democratic Party (SPD) from 2002 to 2013. It was won by Jana Schimke of the Christian Democratic Union (CDU) in 2017. Sylvia Lehmann regained it for the SPD in 2021.

Election results

2021 election

2017 election

2013 election

2009 election

Notes

References

Federal electoral districts in Brandenburg
Teltow-Fläming
2002 establishments in Germany
Constituencies established in 2002
Oberspreewald-Lausitz
Dahme-Spreewald